Patton is an unincorporated community in Greenbrier and Monroe counties, West Virginia, United States. Patton is east of Alderson.

References

Unincorporated communities in Greenbrier County, West Virginia
Unincorporated communities in Monroe County, West Virginia
Unincorporated communities in West Virginia